Soviet War Memorials in Romania commemorate the role of the Soviet Union in World War II.

Following the war, hundreds of such memorials were built and inscribed in honor of the Red Army soldiers participating in the capture of Romania. They are protected by a 2003 law guaranteeing the integrity of graves and war memorials.

List

Notes

References

Monuments and memorials in Romania
Statues in Romania
Romania
Romania–Soviet Union relations